Puerto Rico Highway 167 (PR-167) is one of the main highways in the San Juan–Caguas–Guaynabo metropolitan area of Puerto Rico. Highway 167 starts at Puerto Rico Highway 165 in Levittown and goes until Puerto Rico Highway 156 in Comerío. It is two-lane per direction all through Cataño and a vast area of Bayamón, and becomes rural a couple of kilometers before entering Naranjito. During the rainy season this road is risky as there is chance of rock fall and debris onto the road. This occurs mainly due to an increase in the moisture content of the soil, which loosens the suspended rocks adjacent to the highway. It has been proposed to make this road fully parallel to the future tollway PR-5, which will be extended until Comerío. The future tollway will pass through the only cable-suspended bridge in the island in Bayamón near the border with Naranjito.

The Plata Bridge, a Parker truss bridge built in 1908, was the original connection for route 167 across the Río La Plata, spanning between Bayamón and Naranjito municipalities. It has been replaced by an adjacent modern bridge that now carries PR-167.

Major intersections

See also

 List of highways numbered 167

References

External links
 

167